I Am Alpha and Omega is an American Christian hardcore punk band from Flemington, New Jersey. The band started making music in 2007. Their membership is Donny Hardy, Peach Hardy, Ilya Fish, Scott Soffer, and Dillon Thornberry. The band released an independently made extended play, Georgia May, in 2008. They signed to Come&Live! Records, where they released, The War I Wage, an extended play, in 2009. Their first studio album, The Roar and the Whisper, was released by Come&Live! Records, in 2010.

"I am Alpha and Omega" is said by God in the Book of Revelation (Apocalypse).

Background 
I Am Alpha and Omega is a Christian hardcore band from Flemington, New Jersey. Their members are  lead vocalist, Donny Hardy, guitarist, Ilya Fish and Dillon Thornberry, bassist, Scott Soffer, and drummer, Peach Hardy.

Music history 
The band commenced as a musical entity in 2007, with their first release, Georgia May, an extended play, that was released independently in 2008, while they released another extended play independently, The War I Wage, in 2009, with Come&Live! Records. They released, a studio album, The Roar and the Whisper, on September 5, 2010, with Come&Live! Records.

Members 
 Donny Hardy – vocals
 Ilya Fish – guitar
 Dillon Thornberry – guitar
 Scott Soffer – bass
 Peach Hardy – drums

Former Members 
 Brad Hardy - Guitar
 Kyle Mayer - Keyboards/pig squeals 
 Matt Tobin - Electribe
 Chris Sailer - Guitar 
 Gunner Brand - Guitar 
 Dillon Thornberry - Guitar 
 Tom Aversa - Electribe
 Kyle Reut - Electribe
 Sean Kalaras - Bass
 John Doe - Guitar 
 Colin Falzone - Bass
 Corey Boston - Bass
 Ryan McDavid - Guitar
 Dennis Summers - Bass
 Tom Seal - Guitar 
 Josh “Rosey” Kassinger - Guitar 
 Jason Savage - Bass 
 Joel Dill - Guitar 
 Bill Mick - Drums

Discography 
Studio albums
 The Roar and the Whisper (September 5, 2010, Come&Live! Records)
EPs
 Georgia May (July 7, 2007, Independent)
 The War I Wage (May 8, 2009, Come&Live! Records)

References

External links 
 Facebook page

Musical groups from New Jersey
2007 establishments in New Jersey
Musical groups established in 2007
Book of Revelation